Raktha Sakshi is a 1982 Indian Malayalam film, directed by P. Chandrakumar and produced by T. K. Balachandran. The film stars Prem Nazir, Jose Prakash, Menaka and M. G. Soman in the lead roles. The film has musical score by A. T. Ummer.

Cast
Prem Nazir
Jose Prakash
Menaka
M. G. Soman
Paravoor Bharathan
Ravikumar
Seema

Soundtrack
The music was composed by A. T. Ummer and the lyrics were written by Mankombu Gopalakrishnan.

References

External links
 

1982 films
Films scored by A. T. Ummer
1980s Malayalam-language films
Films directed by P. Chandrakumar